Kendra Slawinski, OBE (née Lowe) (born 11 November 1962) is a former netball player for England. She had been part of the England national netball team between 1987 and 1997. She has represented her country on 128 occasions. She is one of the few netball players that is featured in the Guinness Book of Records for being the most capped player both in England and Internationally. Her brother is former footballer and ECU Joondalup SC head coach Kenny Lowe. In 1995, she was awarded an OBE for her services to Netball and inducted into the All England Netball Association Hall of Fame in 2001. She is now a coach for the Mavericks Superleague team. She is also an Assistant Headteacher at Cardinal Newman Catholic School in Luton.

Notes

References
"National Champions", Bedford Today 24 March 2005. Accessed 13 April 2008.
"History of Netball" (PDF), SportFocus, 13 May 2002. Accessed 13 April 2008.

English netball players
1962 births
Living people
Officers of the Order of the British Empire
Netball Superleague coaches
English netball coaches
Netball players at the 1989 World Games